Ahmad Fuad Osman (born 1969) also known as Fuad, is a contemporary artist and painter in Malaysia known for installation art inspired by social and cultural changes. He is one of the founding members of the artist collective Matahati, formed in 1991, which played a role in the development of Malaysian contemporary art. He currently works and resides in Kuala Lumpur.

In 1998, Faud joined protests around the firing of Anwar Ibrahim. The National Art Gallery in Kuala Lumpur organized a mid-career survey of his work in 2019–20. All artwork in this survey was approved by the museum, but on January 31 four artworks were removed allegedly due to being politically obscene.

Awards 

 1994: Honourable Mention, Malaysian Art Open, Petronas Gallery, Kuala Lumpur, Malaysia
 1994: Honourable Mention, Philip Morris Malaysia Art Award, National Art Gallery, Malaysia
 2000: Jurors Choice, Philip Morris Malaysia Art Award, National Art Gallery, Malaysia
 2003: Jurors Choice, Philip Morris Malaysia Art Award, National Art Gallery, Malaysia
 2004: Asian Artists Fellowship, Freeman Foundation, Vermont Studio Centre, United States
 2005/2006: Asian Artists Fellowship, Goyang National Art Studio, South Korea
 2008: Jurors Choice, APBF Art Awards 2008, Singapore Art Museum, Singapore

References 

20th-century Malaysian artists
21st-century Malaysian artists
Malaysian painters
Living people
1969 births
Installation artists
Contemporary artists
20th-century male artists
21st-century male artists
Social commentators